Shamann Walton is an American politician from San Francisco. He has been a member of the San Francisco Board of Supervisors since 2019, representing District 10, and served as President of the San Francisco Board of Supervisors from January 8, 2021 to January 9, 2023. Walton earlier served on the San Francisco Board of Education and was its president immediately prior to his election as supervisor.

Early life 
Walton was raised by his mother in Vallejo, California. His teenage years were often troubled, having been expelled from the Vallejo City Unified School District and served in juvenile hall numerous times.

Walton graduated from Morris Brown College in 1998. He received his master's degree in public administration from San Francisco State University in 2010.

San Francisco Board of Supervisors 
Walton was elected supervisor for District 10 on November 6, 2018, receiving 9,550 first preference votes (41.22 percent of all valid votes). After allocation of preferences from eliminated candidates in San Francisco's ranked-choice voting system, Walton received 63.07 percent of final-round votes, compared to runner-up Tony Kelly's 36.93 percent. He was sworn in at the Board of Supervisors' January 8, 2019 meeting, replacing Malia Cohen, who was ineligible to run for re-election after two four-year terms and had been elected to the California Board of Equalization.

The Board elected Walton to Board President in 2021.

Housing 
Walton was the only San Francisco Board of Supervisors member to explicitly reject a potential plan to allow four-plexes in San Francisco in areas previously restricted to single-family housing (which had been implemented in the neighboring city of Sacramento). He stated that the Sacramento bill "would speed up the gentrification" and "this policy is bad for San Francisco."

In 2019, Walton supported a resolution that expressed opposition to California Senate Bill 50, which mandates denser housing near “job-rich” areas and transit hubs.

Policing 
In December 2018, Walton and supervisor Hillary Ronen put forth legislation calling to close San Francisco's youth detention center by December 2021.

In June 2020, during the nationwide George Floyd protests, he introduced a resolution to ban the San Francisco Police Department and Sheriff's Department from hiring officers with a history of serious misconduct. In October, he introduced the CAREN act, which would make fraudulent emergency telephone calls motivated by racism illegal.

Racial issues 
In February 2020, Walton put forth a resolution calling for reparations for the city's African American population. The resolution itself forms a working group that will further develop the plan.

In July 2022, Walton admitted to using a racial slur against an African American sheriff's cadet at San Francisco City Hall because he was frustrated with having to take off his belt for metal detectors.

Transportation 
In July 2020, Walton and supervisor Aaron Peskin opted to not introduce a $100 million sales tax measure into the November 2020 ballots to finance Caltrain, which has seen a 95% reduction in ridership due to the COVID-19 pandemic in California. Ride fares account for 70% of the service's operating budget. The supervisors cite the lack of shared authority on the Joint Powers Board over the train line's management, which was operated by the SamTrans, and the regressive nature of the sales tax to fund operations for a service whose customer base has a mean income of $120,000 as pain points to supporting the measure. However, Peskin mentioned that the measure can still be introduced by the mayor or other supervisors if they wanted to. The supervisors later changed their minds when Caltrain pledged to make changes to its structure, making it more independent from SamTrans.

During the COVID-19 pandemic, John F Kennedy Drive in Golden Gate Park was made car-free. Walton and Ahsha Safaí opposed making the JFK Drive car-free after the pandemic. Walton argued that keeping the street car-free was segregationist and recreational redlining. Data obtained by the San Francisco Recreation & Parks Department showed that no district showed a change in its proportion of overall visits to JFK Drive by more than 1.5% during the pandemic, with Walton's District 10 showing a decrease of 0.3%.

Personal life 
Walton is a Christian. He is a father of two.

References

Sources

 
 

Living people
San Francisco Board of Supervisors members
21st-century American politicians
California Democrats
Year of birth missing (living people)
African-American city council members in California
Morris Brown College alumni
San Francisco State University alumni
People from Vallejo, California
American Christians
21st-century African-American politicians
School board members in California
Bayview–Hunters Point, San Francisco